Wonderworld may refer to:
 Wonderworld (musical), a musical production staged at the 1964 New York World's Fair
 Wonderworld (album), a 1974 album by Uriah Heep
 Simon Townsend's Wonder World, an Australian children's television show
 Wonderworld, the CGI animated amusement park from the hit broadcasting company, Japan Broadcasting Corporation
 Wonder World (Texas), a real-life amusement park at Wonder Cave in San Marcos, Texas
 Wonder World Tour (disambiguation), multiple music tours
 Wonder World (album), an album by the Wonder Girls

More
 Wonderland (disambiguation)